Brenda Catton (born 4 January 1962), now Brenda Foster, is an Australian former professional tennis player.

Catton grew up on a vineyard in the Victorian town of Woorinen and received a scholarship to the AIS in Canberra. A top-ten nationally ranked player, she had a win over Dianne Evers in the first round of the 1980 Australian Open.

References

External links
 
 

1962 births
Living people
Australian female tennis players
Tennis people from Victoria (Australia)
Australian Institute of Sport tennis players
People from Swan Hill
20th-century Australian women